Goody Grace (born Branson Gudmundson; June 19, 1997) is a Canadian musician, singer, songwriter and producer from Selkirk, Manitoba. He has released one full length album and two EPs, as well as having co-written songs for musicians such as Machine Gun Kelly and Cody Simpson. He first gained popularity in the early 2010s as a rapper, and has since evolved his sound to include elements of pop, rock, and alternative music. Grace has released a number of successful singles, including "Two Shots", "Scumbag" and "Who Cares?".

Early life
Grace was born on June 19, 1997, in Selkirk, Manitoba, to parents of Icelandic descent. He first became interested in playing music at four years old, and began recording and producing music at nine, attempting to recreate the production sound of Juicy J and his group Three 6 Mafia. In his teens would cover artists including Taylor Swift and the Weeknd.

Career
At seventeen Grace moved to Los Angeles and soon began touring the West Coast of the United States with Gnash. The following year he legally changed his name to Goody Grace. In 2015, he wrote "Flower" by Cody Simpson and featured on Gnash's song "That One Song", Huey Mack's song "Things Change". He released his debut single "Memories" in November 2015, eventually catching the attention of the Neighbourhood vocalist Jesse Rutherford. Soon after, a version of "Memories" was released featuring Rutherford. In the following years he featured on Hoodie Allen's song "Heartbreak" and Gnash's song "Two Shots".

March 16, 2018, he released the single "In the Light of the Moon", featuring Lil Aaron. His debut EP "Infinite" was released on March 22, 2018, through Atlantic Records. On July 27, 2018, he released the single "Too High" featuring Jesse Rutherford. On October 10, 2018, he released the single "Girls In The Suburbs Singing Smiths Songs", featuring G-Eazy. On November 18, 2018, Grace opened for Blink-182 at Palms Casino Resort in Las Vegas.

On July 26, 2019, he released the single "Wasting Time". On October 30, 2019, Grace released the single "Scumbag" featuring Blink-182, which was accompanied by a music video, directed by Kyle Cogan and Kyle Dunleavy. The single was promoted as "featuring Blink-182", though the band's guitarist, Matt Skiba, was absent from the collaboration. On February 27, 2020, they performed the song on Jimmy Kimmel Live!.

Grace co-wrote Machine Gun Kelly's song "Why Are You Here", which was released on December 18, 2019. On January 29, 2020, he was featured on Yung Pinch's song "Hanging With Ghosts", which also featured Good Charlotte. On April 23, 2020, he released the single "If I Want To". On April 26, Grace was featured on Mod Sun's single "Stay Away", which also featured Machine Gun Kelly. After a performance in Memphis, Tennessee supporting Project Pat, Grace was introduced to Juicy J. On August 21, 2020, the pair released the song "Nothing Good" together along with G-Eazy. He featured Lily Kershaw's song "Now & Then", which was released on October 10, 2020.

Musical style and influences
Grace's music contains elements of punk rock, hip hop, folk and pop music, and has been variously called a rapper, a pop singer and a rock musician. The Guardian called him an "emo rocker", and a 2019 article from Alternative Press stated that he "graduated from the school of punk rock, but now he’s fast approaching the top of alt-pop".

In a 2018 interview with Alternative Press, Grace described his music as "A kind of modern evolution of music like blink-182".

He has cited influences including My Chemical Romance, Tom Waits, Glenn Danzig, Morrissey, Blink-182, the Misfits, Three 6 Mafia, Lil Wayne and Bob Dylan.

Discography

Studio albums

Extended plays

Singles

References

People from Selkirk, Manitoba
Musicians from Manitoba
Canadian people of Icelandic descent
Canadian pop musicians
Canadian rock musicians
21st-century Canadian rappers
1997 births
Atlantic Records artists
Living people